Jovem Pan is the main Brazilian radio station based in São Paulo, Brazil. It is also the largest network of radio stations of the southern hemisphere, of Latin America, and one of the biggest radio stations in the world. The network has several bureaus, 109 affiliated stations all over Brazil. Jovem Pan broadcasts through satellite digital quality sound reaching more than 25 million listeners, and throughout the world by the Internet.

History

1940s
Paulo Machado de Carvalho left the station in 1942, going to Rádio Record. The general direction was then assumed by Antonio Augusto Amaral de Carvalho (Tuta), current director president of REDE JOVEM PAN SAT, that at that time was only 21 years old. In that same year, Panamericana left São Bento Street and went to the 275 Riachuelo Street.

1950s
Years later, in 1953, Tuta left the broadcasting station to dedicate himself to TV Record, channel 7 of São Paulo, who were beginning transmissions. In 1954, Panamericana moved again to 713 Avenida Miruna, in the neighborhood of the Airport, where the Group of United Broadcasting stations resided.

1960s
In 1964, still linked to TV Record, Antonio Augusto Amaral de Carvalho assumed the direction of the broadcasting station again. The name Jovem Pan appeared in 1965, given by Paulo Machado de Carvalho. The great transformation of Panamericana began in 1966, under the direction of Tuta. Already with the name of Jovem Pan, to radio it began several programs with idols of the Brazilian popular music that, at that time, they made great success in TV Record. The journalistic programs were created in 1970, 71 and 72, period in that they appeared the Team Seven and Thirty, the Newspaper National Integration and, finally, the Newspaper of the Morning, that is a reference in the journalism of radio in every country until today.

1970s
In 1973, Antonio Augusto Amaral de Carvalho left TV Record to dedicate himself exclusively to Rádio Jovem Pan. In that same year, he acquired the actions of the siblings' broadcasting station Paulo Machado of Carvalho Filho and Alfredo de Carvalho, becoming its only proprietor. In 1976, Jovem Pan left the avenue Miruna and is now situated at 807 Avenida Paulista. In the same year, Jovem Pan FM was inaugurated, located in the same place.

2020s

In 27 October 2021, the Joven Pan Group launched a pay-tv news channel.

Jovem Pan FM stations

Alagoas
Jovem Pan FM - Maceió - 102,7 MHz

Amazonas
Jovem Pan FM - Manaus - 104,1 MHz

Bahia
Jovem Pan FM - Salvador - 91,3 MHz
Jovem Pan FM - Barreiras - 89,5 MHz
Jovem Pan FM - Eunápolis - 90,3 MHz
Jovem Pan FM - Feira de Santana - 100,9 MHz

Ceará
Jovem Pan FM - Fortaleza - 94,7 MHz
Jovem Pan FM - Jijoca de Jericoacoara - 91,7 MHz

Distrito Federal
Jovem Pan FM - Brasília - 106,3 MHz

Espírito Santo
Jovem Pan FM - Vitória - 100,1 MHz

Goiás
Jovem Pan FM - Goiânia - 106,7 MHz
Jovem Pan FM - Caldas Novas - 105,7 MHz

Maranhão
Jovem Pan FM - São Luís - 102,5 MHz

Mato Grosso
Jovem Pan FM - Cuiabá - 94,9 MHz
Jovem Pan FM - Rondonópolis - 102,9 MHz
Jovem Pan FM - Barra do Garças - 91,1 MHz
Jovem Pan FM - Sinop - 93,1 MHz
Jovem Pan FM - Lucas do Rio Verde - 102,3 MHz

Mato Grosso do Sul
Jovem Pan FM - Campo Grande - 95,3 MHz
Jovem Pan FM - Coxim - 90,3 MHz
Jovem Pan FM - Três Lagoas - 104,5 MHz

Minas Gerais
Jovem Pan FM - Belo Horizonte - 99,1 MHz
Jovem Pan FM - Araxá - 93,5 MHz
Jovem Pan FM - Cataguases - 105,7 MHz
Jovem Pan FM - Ipatinga - 102,3 MHz
Jovem Pan FM - Montes Claros - 93,5 MHz
Jovem Pan FM - Muriaé - 98,7 MHz
Jovem Pan FM -  Passos - 96,9 MHz
Jovem Pan FM - Varginha - 107,3 MHz
Jovem Pan FM - Uberaba - 103,7 MHz
Jovem Pan FM - Patos de Minas - 103,3 MHz
Jovem Pan FM - Poços de Caldas - 90,9 MHz

Paraíba
Jovem Pan FM - João Pessoa - 102,5 MHz

Paraná
Jovem Pan FM - Curitiba - 103,9 MHz
Jovem Pan FM - Londrina - 102,9 MHz
Jovem Pan FM - Maringá - 101,3 MHz
Jovem Pan FM - Ponta Grossa - 103,5 MHz
Jovem Pan FM - Foz do Iguaçu - 93,3 MHz
Jovem Pan FM - Cascavel - 101,5 MHz
Jovem Pan FM - Arapoti - 103,1 MHz
Jovem Pan FM - Guarapuava - 96,1 MHz
Jovem Pan FM - União da Vitória - 98,3 MHz

Pernambuco
Jovem Pan FM - Recife - 95,9 MHz
Jovem Pan FM - Caruaru - 101,3 MHz

Rio de Janeiro
Jovem Pan FM - Três Rios - 92,9 MHz
Jovem Pan FM - Itaperuna - 91,3 MHz

Rio Grande do Norte
Jovem Pan FM - Natal - 89,9 MHz

Rio Grande do Sul
Jovem Pan FM - Porto Alegre - 90,7 MHz
Jovem Pan FM - Osório - 103,1 MHz
Jovem Pan FM - Passo Fundo - 106,9 MHz
Jovem Pan FM - Bento Gonçalves - 92,5 MHz

Santa Catarina
Jovem Pan FM - Florianópolis - 101,7 MHz
Jovem Pan FM - Rio do Sul - 93,9 MHz
Jovem Pan FM - Blumenau - 88,7 MHz
Jovem Pan FM - Chapecó - 94,1 MHz
Jovem Pan FM - Criciúma - 104,3 MHz
Jovem Pan FM - Itajaí - 94,1 MHz
Jovem Pan FM - Joaçaba - 103,9 MHz
Jovem Pan FM -  Joinville - 91,1 MHz
Jovem Pan FM - Tubarão - 94,9 MHz

São Paulo
Jovem Pan FM - São Paulo - 100,9 MHz
Jovem Pan FM - Apiaí - 92,5 MHz
Jovem Pan FM - Araçatuba - 104,3 MHz
Jovem Pan FM - Jaboticabal - 107,3 MHz
Jovem Pan FM - Itapetininga - 100,7 MHz
Jovem Pan FM - Itapeva - 91,7 MHz
Jovem Pan FM - Presidente Prudente - 101,7 MHz
Jovem Pan FM - Santa Fé do Sul - 92,5 MHz
Jovem Pan FM - São Carlos - 88,5 MHz
Jovem Pan FM - Tupã - 89,5 MHz
Jovem Pan FM - Campinas - 89,9 MHz
Jovem Pan FM - São José dos Campos - 94,3 MHz
Jovem Pan FM - Sorocaba - 91,1 MHz
Jovem Pan FM - Ribeirão Preto - 93,1 MHz
Jovem Pan FM - Santos - 95,1 MHz
Jovem Pan FM - Piracicaba - 103,1 MHz
Jovem Pan FM - Taubaté - 98,3 MHz
Jovem Pan FM - Marília - 100,9 MHz
Jovem Pan FM - Matão - 88,1 MHz
Jovem Pan FM - Catanduva - 91,5 MHz
Jovem Pan FM - Barretos - 101,5 MHz
Jovem Pan FM - São João da Boa Vista - 95,9 MHz
Jovem Pan FM - Barra Bonita - 97,7 MHz
Jovem Pan FM - Bauru - 95,5 MHz
Jovem Pan FM - Dracena - 101,5 MHz
Jovem Pan FM - Avaré - 102,1 MHz
Jovem Pan FM - Ourinhos - 88,9 MHz

Sergipe
Jovem Pan FM - Aracaju - 88,7 MHz

Jovem Pan News stations

Ceará
Jovem Pan News - Fortaleza - 92,9 MHz

Espírito Santo
Jovem Pan News - Vitória - 90,5 MHz

Distrito Federal
Jovem Pan News - Brasília - 750 kHz

Goiás
Jovem Pan News - Águas Lindas de Goiás - 107,9 MHz

Minas Gerais
Jovem Pan News - Ituiutaba - 1240 kHz

Rio Grande do Norte
Jovem Pan News - Natal - 93,5 MHz

Rio Grande do Sul
Jovem Pan News - Imbé - 92,3 MHz

Santa Catarina
Jovem Pan News - Florianópolis - 103,3 MHz
Jovem Pan News - Joinville - 1250 kHz
Jovem Pan News - Rio do Sul - 620 kHz
Jovem Pan News - Criciúma - 101,5 MHz
Jovem Pan News - Tubarão - 95,9 MHz

São Paulo
Jovem Pan News - São Paulo - 620 kHz
Jovem Pan News - São José do Rio Preto - 900 kHz
Jovem Pan News - Andradina - 101,3 MHz
Jovem Pan News - Barretos - 103,3 MHz
Jovem Pan News - Bauru - 97,5 MHz
Jovem Pan News - Campinas - 100,3 MHz
Jovem Pan News - Jaú - 1490 kHz
Jovem Pan News - Santos - 590 kHz
Jovem Pan News - Piracicaba - 99,5 MHz
Jovem Pan News - Pompeia - 98,7 MHz
Jovem Pan News - Rio Claro - 1410 kHz

References

External links
 

Radio stations in Brazil
Radio stations established in 1944
Mass media in São Paulo